The Eugène Marais Prize is a South African literary prize awarded by the Suid-Afrikaanse Akademie vir Wetenskap en Kuns for a first or early publication in Afrikaans. In 1971 it was renamed after the Afrikaans poet and researcher Eugène Marais. The prize has no genre limitation, but only works that have appeared in the previous calendar year are eligible. Further, an author can only win the award once. The prize money (as of 2009) was R22 000 and was sponsored by ABSA and Rapport.

List of winners 
 1961 – Audrey Blignault ( and her contribution to )
 1963 – André P. Brink (Caesar)
 1964 – Dolf van Niekerk;  Elsa Joubert
 1965 – George Louw
 1966 – Henriette Grové (all of her dramatic work)
 1967 – Abraham H. de Vries (all of his prose)
 1968 – M.M. Walters (Cabala)
 1970 – P.G. Hendriks
 1971 – Sheila Cussons (')
 1972 – Lina Spies
 1973 – Antjie Krog
 1974 – Leon Strydom
 1975 – P.J. Haasbroek
 1976 – J.C. Steyn
 1978 – Marlene van Niekerk
 1979 – Eveleen Castelyn
 1980 – Petra Müller
 1981 – Annesu de Vos
 1982 – Louis Krüger
 1983 – E. Kotze
 1984 – Etienne van Heerden
 1985 – Alexander Strachan
 1986 – Freek Swart
 1987 – Joan Hambidge; Deon Opperman
 1988 – P.C. Haarhoff
 1989 – Philip de Vos
 1990 – Henning Pieterse
 1991 – Pieter Stoffberg
 1992 – Riana Scheepers
 1993 – Marita van der Vyver
 1994 – Mark Behr; Ronel de Goede
 1995 – Johan Myburg
 1996 – E.W.S. Hammond; A.H.M. Scholtz
 1997 – Jaco Fouché
 1998 – Johann Botha
 1999 – Cristoffel Coetzee (posthumous)
 2000 – S.P. Benjamin
 2001 – Tom Dreyer
 2002 – Dine van Zyl
 2003 – Barbara Fölscher
 2004 – Ilse van Staden
 2005 – Melanie Grobler
 2006 – Marlize Hobbs
 2007 – Danie Marais
 2008 – Helena Gunter
 2009 – Ronelda Kamfer; Loftus Marais
 2010 – Carel van der Merwe
 2011 – Nicole Jaekel Strauss
 2012 – Sonja Loots
 2013 – Hennie Nortjé
 2014 – Dominique Botha
 2015 – Nicola Hanekom
 2016 – Stephanus Muller
 2017 – Bibi Slippers; Lien Botha; Amy Jephta
 2018 – Fanie Naudé
 2019 – Andries Buys ( under the pseudonym Lodewyk G. du Plessis)
 2020 – Johan Jack Smith
 2021 – Jolyn Phillips

References 

Afrikaans literature
South African literary awards